The Danish Badminton League, is the national team tournament for badminton clubs in Denmark. The winner qualifies for Europe Cup.

Winners

See also
 Danish National Badminton Championships

References

Badminton in Denmark
1949 establishments in Denmark
Recurring sporting events established in 1949